In military terms, 13th Division or 13th Infantry Division may refer to:

Infantry divisions
 13th Division (People's Republic of China)
 13th Division (German Empire)
 13th Reserve Division (German Empire)
 13th Waffen Mountain Division of the SS Handschar (1st Croatian), a German unit in WWII
 13th Panzergrenadier Division (Bundeswehr), Germany
 13th Infantry Division (Greece)
 13th Infantry Division "Re", a unit of the Royal Italian Army
 13th Division (Imperial Japanese Army)
 13th Division (North Korea)
 13th Infantry Division (Poland)
 13th Guards Rifle Division, Soviet Union
 13th Rifle Division (Soviet Union), Soviet Union
 13th Division (Syrian rebel group)
 13th (Western) Division, United Kingdom
 13th Division (United States)
 13th Division (Syrian rebel group)

Airborne divisions
 13th Guards Airborne Division, Soviet Union
 13th Airborne Division (United States)

Armoured divisions
13th Armored Division (United States)
13th Tank Division (People's Republic of China)
13th Tank Division (Czechoslovakia)
13th Guards Tank Division, Soviet Union
 13th Panzer Division (Wehrmacht), a German unit in WWII

Aviation divisions
 13th Strategic Missile Division, United States
13th Air Defense Division

Other divisions
 13th Army Division, Sweden
13th Guards Cavalry Division, Soviet Union

See also
 13th Army (disambiguation)
 13th Brigade (disambiguation)
 13th Regiment (disambiguation)
 13th Group (disambiguation)
 13 Squadron (disambiguation)